Shanti Nagar is a neighborhood in the Karachi East district of Karachi, Pakistan. It is a part of the Gulshan Town.

There are several ethnic groups living in Shanti Nagar including Kutchi, Muhajirs, Sindhis, Kashmiris, Seraikis, Pakhtuns, Balochis, Memons, Bohras,  Ismailis, etc. Over 85% of the population is Muslim. The population of Gulshan Town is estimated to be nearly one million. Shanti Nagar has Hindu and Christian population. The neighbourhood comprises 12 localities with a population of over 100,000 people.

References

External linksu 
 Karachi Website.
 Gulberg Town.

Neighbourhoods of Karachi
Gulshan Town